Ondřej Čelůstka (born 18 June 1989) is a Czech professional footballer  who plays as a defender for Czech First League club Sparta Prague. He is a member of the Czech Republic national team and represented the under-21 team at the 2011 UEFA European Under-21 Football Championship.

Club career

Slavia Prague
Čelůstka began his career with Fastav Zlín, making his professional debut in the Czech First League during the 2007–08 season, and then playing more regularly in the following one. His good performances then ensured him a regular place with Czech leading club Slavia Prague, with whom he made fourteen appearances and a goal in the first half of the 2009–10 Czech First League.

Loan to Palermo
On 1 February 2010, Čelůstka signed with Serie A outfit U.S. Città di Palermo on loan, with an option for the Sicilians to sign the player permanently at the end of the season. He was awarded the number #89 jersey from the rosanero.

He played his first game in a rosanero jersey, as well as his first Serie A game, as a second-half substitute for Marco Calderoni in a 3–1 home win versus Bologna.

Trabzonspor

On 8 July 2011, Čelůstka moved to Turkish club Trabzonspor for a transfer fee of €900,000 and signed a five-year contract. The club gave him the number 28 jersey.

During a game against Inter Milan at the San Siro, Čelůstka scored the only goal of the game in a 1–0 away win for Trabzonspor in the 2011–12 UEFA Champions League.

Loan to Sunderland
Čelůstka joined English Premier League club Sunderland on a season-long loan deal on 12 August 2013.

He made his Premier League debut for Sunderland at the Stadium of Light five days later. Čelůstka hit a half volley from 30 yards which was saved by Maarten Stekelenburg as the team began the season with a 1–0 defeat to Fulham.

Čelůstka was an unused substitute as Sunderland lost 3–1 to Manchester City in the 2014 Football League Cup Final at Wembley Stadium on 2 March.

1. FC Nürnberg
On 24 August 2014, Čelůstka joined 1. FC Nürnberg of the 2. Bundesliga on a free transfer after being released from Trabzonspor.

Antalyaspor
In July 2015, Čelůstka agreed a move to Turkish club Antalyaspor.

Sparta Prague
On 31 July 2020, Čelůstka joined Sparta Prague of the Czech First League on a free transfer after being released from Antalyaspor.

International career
Čelůstka represented the Czech Republic at under 19 and under 20 level, before being capped 18 times for the under 21s. His performances at the 2011 UEFA European Under-21 Football Championship saw him named in the Team of the Tournament. He made his debut for the Czech Republic full team on 15 November 2013 and scored after just three minutes in a 2–0 win against Canada.

Career statistics

Club

International goals
Scores and results list Czech Republic's goal tally first, score column indicates score after each Čelůstka goal.

Honours
Sunderland
Football League Cup: Runner-up 2013–14

Czech Republic U21 
UEFA European Under-21 Championship bronze: 2011

References

External links

1989 births
Living people
Sportspeople from Zlín
Association football defenders
Czech footballers
Czech Republic youth international footballers
Czech Republic under-21 international footballers
Czech Republic international footballers
Czech First League players
FC Fastav Zlín players
SK Slavia Prague players
Trabzonspor footballers
Palermo F.C. players
Sunderland A.F.C. players
1. FC Nürnberg players
Antalyaspor footballers
AC Sparta Prague players
Serie A players
Süper Lig players
Premier League players
2. Bundesliga players
UEFA Euro 2020 players
Czech expatriate footballers
Expatriate footballers in Italy
Expatriate footballers in Turkey
Expatriate footballers in England
Expatriate footballers in Germany
Czech expatriate sportspeople in Italy
Czech expatriate sportspeople in Turkey
Czech expatriate sportspeople in England
Czech expatriate sportspeople in Germany